Spatalla prolifera, the palmiet spoon, is a flower-bearing shrub that belongs to the genus Spatalla and forms part of the fynbos. The plant is native to the Western Cape, South Africa.

Description
The plant dies after a fire but the seeds survive. The plant is bisexual and pollinated by insects. Two months after the plant has flowered, the ripe seeds fall to the ground where they are spread by ants.

Distribution and habitat
The plant occurs in the Hottentots-Holland Mountains and Kleinmond Mountains along the Palmiet and Steenbras River. It grows in swampy soil, river banks and wetlands at altitudes of

References

http://redlist.sanbi.org/species.php?species=805-22
http://biodiversityexplorer.info/plants/proteaceae/spatalla_prolifera.htm
https://www.proteaatlas.org.za/spoon.htm
https://www.proteaatlas.org.za/PROTEA_ATLAS_main_part2.pdf bl 86

prolifera